Humbug Creek is a stream in the U.S. state of Oregon. It is a tributary to the Applegate River.

Humbug Creek received its name over a dispute ("humbug") between miners.

References

Rivers of Oregon
Rivers of Jackson County, Oregon